Cambarus jonesi, the Alabama cave crayfish, is a small, freshwater crayfish endemic to Alabama in the United States. It is an underground species known only from 12 caves.

Distribution
The Alabama cave crayfish is known from cave systems in the Tennessee River basin between Florence and Guntersville. It has been found in Colbert, Limestone, Lauderdale, Madison, and Morgan counties in Alabama. Specimens from Marshall County, formerly thought to be this species, actually represent two distinct species, Cambarus speleocoopi and Cambarus laconensis

Etymology
The name jonesi honors Walter B. Jones.

References

Cambaridae
Cave crayfish
Endemic fauna of Alabama
Freshwater crustaceans of North America
Crustaceans described in 1960
Taxa named by Horton H. Hobbs Jr.